Virginia International Raceway (commonly known as "VIR") is a race track located in Alton, Virginia, near Danville. It is less than a half-mile from the North Carolina/Virginia border just outside Milton, North Carolina, on the banks of the Dan River. VIR hosts amateur and professional automobile and motorcycle events, driving schools, club days, and private test rentals.

Track description
VIR offers five track configurations, of which two can be run simultaneously. Both consist of a portion of the "Full Course" and short connecting sections that connect to portions of the "Patriot Course" to produce the two courses that can run simultaneously. There is a second pit complex that is used only when running the "South Course". There is also another, seldom run, long configuration called the "Grand West Course" that uses the other two short connecting sections between the "Full Course" and the "Patriot Course." Car and Driver magazine has an annual test of fast cars called "The Lightning Lap" using the "Grand West Course". Since the Patriot course is contained completely inside the Full Course, they can be run simultaneously.

The "Full Course" is the most common configuration. One of the most notable sections of the course, second only to "Oak Tree" (T11), are the "Climbing Esses" which consist of an initial left up-hill (T7), followed by a right which crests at the apex then dropping slightly into a left (T8) which again crests at the apex dropping slightly, and then up into a final left (T9). The complexity and difficulty of this section is multiplied by the incredible entry speed because of a straight section leading into the Climbing Esses. This is followed by a cresting blind left hand turn (T10), "South Bend", that finishes in a steep downward slope. Another signature section is the "Roller Coaster" (T14) which is a scaled-down mirror image to the famed "Corkscrew" at Mazda Raceway Laguna Seca.

There are two main straights on the track. While the back straight is 33% longer, the front straight is where higher speeds are reached since "Hog Pen" (T17) leads onto it and is a much faster corner than "Oak Tree" (T11), which leads onto the longer back straight.

Some of the raceway's other named curves include "Oak Tree", "Horse Shoe", "NASCAR Bend" (because NASCAR drivers Richard Petty, David Pearson and Wendell Scott had difficulties there during a 1966 Trans Am race), "Snake", "Spiral", "Fish Hook", and "The Bitch".

Other configurations

Lap Records

As of October 2022, the fastest official race lap records at Virginia International Raceway (VIR) are listed as:

Celebrities at VIR
Several celebrities have visited VIR. In 2010, part of a special episode of the British television show Top Gear was filmed at the raceway and aired later that year as a part of season 16.

Country music superstar Reba McEntire visited the raceway in 2012 when her son took part in the race.

In early October 2013 actor Patrick Dempsey, a star of Grey's Anatomy, and former athlete and reality-TV star Caitlyn Jenner  raced at the track.

History

The track originally opened August 3, 1957, and was created by a group of men using a bulldozer. The track had been closed from 1974 prior to its reopening in March 2000. The track was reopened in 2000 by New Yorker Harvey Siegel and Connie Nyholm using a "country club" model. Memberships to the track are sold. Each member of the VIR Club receives track time on member days, tickets to all spectator events, and other benefits. VIR's membership model has since been followed by other racetracks across the United States.

There have been at least four deaths in track history, with three fatalities coming since the reopening of the facility. The most recent death was that of 14-year-old Toriano Wilson in a US Rookie Cup motorcycle race in August 2008.

The track hosted the SCCA National Sports Car Championship from its opening in 1957 until the series' demise in 1964.  The IMSA GT Championship visited VIR in 1971 and 1972. After its re-opening, the AMA Superbike Championship held races at VIR from 2001 until 2010 on the North Course. The Rolex Sports Car Series utilized the Full Course from 2002 through 2011. The American Le Mans Series used the Full Course configuration for its inaugural event at VIR in September 2012 where a new track record was set by Klaus Graf driving the Muscle Milk LMP1 car.

Driving a Maserati 450S, Carroll Shelby won the feature race on the track’s inaugural weekend in August 1957. The list of other well-known drivers who raced at VIR during its first incarnation includes Briggs Cunningham, Walt Hansgen, Roger Penske, Mark Donohue, Richard Petty, Bob Holbert, Augie Pabst, Curtis Turner, Dick Thompson, Peter Revson, Wendell Scott, Bob Tullius, Janet Guthrie, Skip Barber, Ricky Rudd, Gene Felton, Denise McCluggage, Hurley Haywood, Brock Yates, Don Yenko, Lance Reventlow, Dan Gurney and Parnelli Jones.

The track hosts many events throughout the year, including the annual Gold Cup Historic Race as well as AMA races, ChampCar Endurance Series, SCCA, NASCAR K&N Pro Series East, NASCAR test days, and local car club events. Various driving training classes are available on the paved and unpaved (off-road) courses. The site also hosts a go kart track.

Since 2014, VIR has hosted a GT only race in the IMSA WeatherTech SportsCar Championship.

Testing
The track is frequently used for test sessions by NASCAR teams. The teams use the road course to test their road course cars for the Watkins Glen International and Sonoma Raceway races. Since the track is not currently active on the principal NASCAR circuit (Trucks, Xfinity and Cup), a practice session is not charged against their allotment.

The track is also used by various manufacturers in testing of new or updated vehicles.

Video games and simulators
All six configurations are featured in racing simulators Automobilista, rFactor 2, and iRacing.

VIR is featured in Forza Motorsport 6 as part of the Porsche Expansion Pack released on March 1, 2016. The track is featured with all six of its layouts, as well as daytime, nighttime, dry, and wet conditions. It is also featured in Forza Motorsport 7, released in October 2017.

VIR's North Course is featured in the video games Supercar Challenge and Ferrari Challenge Trofeo Pirelli.

All layouts of VIR were scratch built as a mod for Kunos Simulazioni's racing simulation Assetto Corsa.

See also
944 Cup
ChampCar Endurance Series

Notes

References

External links

VIR Website
Map and circuit history at RacingCircuits.info
Trackpedia guide to driving VIR with logged telemetry from drivers
VIR History

Motorsport venues in Virginia
Buildings and structures in Halifax County, Virginia
Tourist attractions in Halifax County, Virginia
IMSA GT Championship circuits
American Le Mans Series circuits
NASCAR tracks
Road courses in the United States